Lebanese Brazilians, (Arabic: البرازيلي اللبناني) are Brazilians of full or partial Lebanese ancestry, including Lebanese-born immigrants to Brazil. According to the Brazilian Institute of Geography and Statistics, they form some of the largest Asian communities in the country, along with other West Asian and East Asian descendants. 

The population of Brazil of either full or partial Lebanese descent is estimated by the Brazilian and Lebanese governments to be around 7 million people. According to a research conducted by IBGE in 2008, covering only the states of Amazonas, Paraíba, São Paulo, Rio Grande do Sul, Mato Grosso, and Distrito Federal, 0.9% of white Brazilian respondents said they had family origins in the Middle East. If the first figure is correct (7 million), this number of descendants is larger than the population in Lebanon, and the original immigrant population a natural growth of 70 times in less than a century. However, other Middle Eastern countries such as Syria, Jordan, and Palestine also contributed immigrants to Brazil, and nowadays, most of their descendants are of only partial Middle Eastern ancestry.

Immigration of the Lebanese (and Syrians) to Brazil started in the late 19th century, most of them coming from Lebanon and later from Syria. The immigration to Brazil grew further in the 20th century, and was concentrated in the state of São Paulo, but also extended to Minas Gerais, Goiás, Rio de Janeiro, and other parts of Brazil.

Between 1884 and 1933, 130,000 Lebanese people entered Brazil through the Port of Santos—65% of them were Catholics (Maronite Catholics and Melkite Catholics), 20% were Eastern Orthodox, 10% were Muslims (Shia, Sunni), and about 5% were Druze. According to French Consulate reports from that time, Lebanese/Syrian immigrants in São Paulo and Santos were 130,000, in Pará 20,000, Rio de Janeiro 15,000, Rio Grande do Sul 14,000, and in Bahia 12,000. During the Lebanese Civil War (1975–90), around 32,000 Lebanese people immigrated to Brazil.

Although the exact number of Lebanese Brazilians is disputed it is believed by some that there are at least 6 million Brazilians of Lebanese origin. Despite being estimated at less than 4% of the population of the country, descendants of Lebanese immigrants occupied 10% of the parliament seats in 2014 and 8% in 2015.

Lebanese culture has influenced many aspects of Brazil's culture. In big towns of Brazil it is easy to find restaurants of Lebanese food, and dishes, such as sfiha ("esfiha"), hummus, kibbeh ("quibe"), tahina, tabbouleh ("tabule") and halwa are very well known among Brazilians.

Most Lebanese immigrants in Brazil have worked as traders who sell textiles and clothes and open new markets. Lebanese-Brazilians are well-integrated into Brazilian society.

Notable Lebanese Brazilians
Please see List of Lebanese people in Brazil

See also
 Arab Brazilians
 Asian Brazilians
 Brazil–Lebanon relations

References

External links

 
Ethnic groups in Brazil
Lebanese diaspora in South America
Brazil